The FJ Holden is a 1977 Australian film directed by Michael Thornhill. The FJ Holden is a snapshot of the life of young teenage men in Bankstown, New South Wales, Australia in the 1970s and deals with the characters' difficulty in reconciling mateship with respect for a girlfriend.

Debi Enker in Australian Cinema comments: "The FJ Holden presents the suburbs as a cultural and spiritual desert. It is a place where regular bouts with the bottle are the only antidote for lives without hope or direction."

The film initially received a R classification from the Australian Film Board of Review, but after an appeal to the censors it was revised to a M classification for moderate sex scenes and moderate coarse language. However, all states except Victoria and New South Wales exercised their right to override the Commonwealth decision and retained the R classification.

Plot
Kevin (Paul Couzens) and his best mate Bob (Carl Stever) drive around Sydney trying to pick up girls in Kevin's FJ Holden. Kevin meets Anne (Eva Dickinson) at a party and she agrees to let him drive her home because she's keen to check out the back seat of his FJ. Bob joins the ride, and she has sex with both men in the FJ. Because Kevin was second to have sex with Anne, a relationship develops between the two and they go to restaurants, race cars, bathe Anne's little brother and get drunk.

Kev is initially nervous when introducing Anne to his father, but is put at ease when his father looks across the lounge room and says to Kev, "Jesus, you’re doing alright for yourself".

The romance falters, even though Kevin lets Bob watch them having sex in her bedroom.

Drunk and upset about not being able to grow a moustache like Bobs, Kevin tries to talk to Bob, who is incapable of a serious conversation because he's always drunk. Bob is secretly happy that he has his friend back, but neither is capable of saying what he feels.

Cast
Paul Couzens as Kevin
Eva Dickinson as Anne
Carl Stever as Bob
Gary Waddell as Deadlegs
Graham Rouse as sergeant
Karlene Rogerson as Cheryl
Vicky Arkley as Chris
Robert Baxter as Senior Constable
Colin Yarwood as Brian
Sigrid Thornton as Wendy
Ray Marshall as Mr Sullivan
Maggie Kirkpatrick as Betty Amstead
Harry Lawrence as security guard

Production
The film originated with a series of comic poems from Terry Larsen. The budget was raised from Greater Union and the Australian Film Commission. It was shot in November and December 1976 in western Sydney. Most of the young actors were amateurs.

Reception
The FJ Holden grossed $710,000 at the box office in Australia, which is equivalent to $3,266,000 in 2009 dollars. This was despite the fact the film was rated "R" in several states. It sold to some overseas countries and eventually recovered its cost.

Home media
The FJ Holden was released on DVD with a new print by Umbrella Entertainment in November 2005. The DVD is compatible with all region codes and includes special features such as the theatrical trailers, Australian trailers and audio commentary with Mike Thornhill moderated by Peter Galvin.

See also
 Cinema of Australia

References

External links

The FJ Holden at Australian Screen Online
The FJ Holden at the National Film and Sound Archive
The FJ Holden at Oz Movies

1977 films
1977 drama films
Australian drama films
Films set in Sydney
Films scored by Jimmy Manzie
1970s English-language films
Films directed by Michael Thornhill